Count Georg Holtzendorff (also spelled Holzendorff) was a painter of Saxony, specialist in landscapes, figure subjects and cherubs, who sought refuge in England in consequence of the Franco-Prussian War.

Works 
Holtzendorff worked for the Royal Crown Derby Porcelain Company and has drawn sketches representing the landscape of Derbyshire that were applied to china.

His main work was the decoration of the Gladstone Dessert Service, presented by the Liberal Working Men of Derby to Prime Minister William Ewart Gladstone in 1883. A watercolor by Holtzendorff (c. 1882), with a view of Becket Street, Derby, with the Derby Museum and Art Gallery in the background, is the only remaining study on paper linked to the Gladstone service.

References 

19th-century German painters
19th-century German male artists
German male painters